Besim Durmuş (born 1 September 1965) is a Turkish football manager.

References

1965 births
Living people
Turkish footballers
Turkish football managers
Kasımpaşa S.K. managers
Kartalspor managers
Samsunspor managers
Boluspor managers
Association footballers not categorized by position